Leonard Rosenfeld (December 14, 1926 – December 2, 2009) was an American expressionist artist who was born in Brooklyn, New York. In the Post-World War II era, Rosenfeld associated with a group of artist known as the New York School. His contemporaries and prominent New York School artists included Willem de Kooning, Franz Kline, Arshile Gorky, Mark Rothko, Clyfford Still, and Robert Motherwell.

Biography

Born and raised in New York City, Rosenfeld served in the United States Army during World War II.  After the war he attended the Art Students League of New York. There he studied drawing, painting, and sculpture. Rosenfeld had a very long and productive sixty-year career as an artist.  He along with other New York School artists, such as Willem de Kooning and Allen Ginsberg became immersed in the abstract expressionist and expressionist scene during the 1950s. Much of their time was marked by social gatherings at the legendary Greenwich Village bar "The Cedar" where beatniks and fellow members of the New York art scene discussed art, sports, and politics. In the late 1950s, Rosenfeld produced a series of "Rail-Road" drawings that would later be displayed by Martha Jackson in 1965 as part of a group exhibition. Rosenfeld, like many great artists, produced many artistic series and his work was shown throughout New York at many prominent galleries, such as his "rag paintings" at Ivan Karp's OK Harris gallery on West Broadway during the 1980s.

Rosenfeld derived his inspiration from the common sights he witnessed every day in New York City and worldwide events. In the 1980s, he experimented with different media, for example Rosenfeld was inspired by loose bits of wire he found on the street.  He took these loose bits and tacked them to canvas stretchers with carpet tacks. He would then render these wires and tacks into works that would later be known as "wire-pieces" and he explored many shapes, colors, and themes. These works are considered by many to be his greatest works from the 1980s-1990s.

The September 11, 2001, terrorist attacks on the World Trade Center had a profound impact on Rosenfeld. His studio faced the World Trade Center and he witnessed, in horror, the towers collapse. His September 11, 2001, art series is poignant in that it depicts the first-hand observations of an expressionist. During the first decade of the new millennium the war on terror provided Rosenfeld with the inspiration to create a series of war, soldier, and terrorist themed paintings. Rosenfeld's career as an artist spanned six decades. He died on December 2, 2009, in New York City.

Inspiration and artistic influences

Late 1950s "Rail Road"
Rosenfeld captured the essence of New York City in the 1950s.  His "Rail Road" paintings are black crayon on paper.  They illustrate various subway scenes throughout the borough of Brooklyn, New York.

1970s "Hookers" 
Living in the East Village throughout the 1960s-1970s Rosenfeld chose to depict the daily interactions of hookers and pimps.  Often his inspiration came from scenes witnessed out in front of his apartment.  Rosenfeld depicts many of his "hookers" in a manner reminiscent of Picasso.

1980s "Wire-Painting" 
Considered by many to be Rosenfeld's most unusual creations, his "wire-paintings" required hours of tedious work.  He would collect bits of wire he found out on the street and bend and fold them into shape.  He would then tack these wires onto a canvass stretcher to form his painting.

September 11, 2001 
Rosenfeld witnessed first hand the horrors of 9/11.  From his studio he witnessed men and women jumping from the trade center buildings.  His paintings offer the viewer a very emotional and riveting depiction of 9/11 through the eyes of an expressionist.

Soldiers and terrorists
Rosenfeld was one of the first known artists to depict the war on terror.  His terrorist and soldier paintings are rendered in vibrant color and shape.

Selected showings

2017: Denise Bibro Fine Arts, New York, NY  (May–June) (exclusive representation by gallery) ("Wires and Cans") (one-man)
2015: LaMama Galeria, New York, NY (December) "Soldiers" (one-man)
2013: International Juried Exhibition (curator, Elisabeth Sussman, Whitney Museum), Viridian Artists, New York, NY (Graffiti painting)
2011: Artwalk NY, New York, NY (auction conducted by Sotheby's) (railroad drawing sold at live auction; pastel at silent auction)(Coalition for the Homeless benefit)
2010: Artwalk NY, New York, NY (auction conducted by Sotheby's) (wire piece sold at live auction; railroad drawing at silent auction) (Coalition for the Homeless benefit)
2009: Salomon Arts Gallery, New York, NY (October–November); Van Der Plas Gallery, New York, NY (August –September)
2008: "War, Madness & Delusion," group juried exhibition, Wilson Chapel and Meetinghouse Galleries, Newton Centre, MA (Iraq war painting)
2007: President's Gallery LaGuardia Community College Gallery, NY; Gallery 311, New York, NY ("Soldiers and Terrorists") (one-man)
2006: Gallery 311, New York, NY (Soldiers and Terrorists) ("Soldiers and Terrorists") (one-man)
2005: Coalition for the Homeless Benefit Small Works Show (one-man studio show); Merz Gallery, Sag Harbor, NY (group show); Viridian Artists, New York, NY (two group shows)
2004: Corridor Gallery, Brooklyn, NY (two-man); Galeria Corona, Puerto Vallarta, Mexico ("Angels") (one-man)
2003: Coalition for the Homeless Benefit Retrospective (one-man studio show)
2002: Corridor Gallery, Brooklyn, NY ("Angels") (two-man); "Art from Detritus,” John Jay College, New York, NY (group)
1999: Leonora Vega Gallery, New York, New York ("Nuts and Bolts") (one-man)
1998: Goldstrom Gallery, New York, NY ("Railroad Drawings") (group "black and white" show)
1996: Henry Street Settlement, New York, NY (group)
1995: Michael Kisslinger Gallery, New York, New York NY (one-man retrospective); Soho Biennial, New York, City (group); NatWest Bank, New York, NY ("Blues") (one-man); Massman Gallery (Rockhurst College), Kansas City, Missouri (group); Eleven East Ashland Independent Art Space, Phoenix, Arizona (group)
1991: The Knitting Factory, New York, NY ("Wires") (one-man)
1989: The Knitting Factory, New York, NY (various works) (one-man)
1988: The Robert Kidd Gallery, Detroit, Michigan (group); Casa Del Lago (University of Mexico), Mexico City ("Wires") (three-man New York artists show)
1986: Central Falls, New York, New York ("Wires") (one-man)
1983: Kenkaleba House, New York, New York(groupP)*
1982: OK Harris Gallery, New York, NY (group); The Race Street Gallery (with OK Harris), Philadelphia, PA (group) (both, Construction (rag) works)
1981: OK Harris Gallery, New York, NY (Construction (rag) works) (group); Grant, Edna St. Vincent Millay Art Colony, Austerlitz, New York (drawings)
1980: OK Harris Summer Invitational (group)
1978: The Brooklyn Museum, Brooklyn, NY; Jacques Seligman, New York, NY (railroad drawings) (group)
1976: Gloria Cortella Gallery, New York, NY (group) (drawings)
1975  The Pennsylvania Academy of Fine Arts, Philadelphia, PA (group)
1965: Martha Jackson Gallery, New York, NY (Railroad drawings) (group)
1963: Stryke Gallery, New York, NY (group)
1962: Waverly Gallery, New York, NY (large oil paintings) (one-man)
1960: Brooklyn Museum Brooklyn, NY juried exhibition of "Brooklyn and Long Island Artists" (group, which also included work by Philip Pearlstein and Larry Rivers)

See also:  Denise Bibro Fine Art (www.denisebibrofineart.com)

References

1926 births
2009 deaths
American artists